The Fundy Trail Parkway is a 30 kilometer-long scenic parkway in the Atlantic Canadian province of New Brunswick along the coast of the Bay of Fundy. The parkway provides access to a number of trails and over 20 lookout locations along the coast, including a 10 kilometer pedestrian and bicycle trail, and a suspension footbridge. The parkway is also located along five different beaches and four waterfalls. There is also an interpretive centre along the route which provides information about the area's history.

Points of interest 
Flowerpot Rock

Flowerpot Rock was a sea stack located along the parkway that was a popular tourist attraction. On February 24, 2022, it collapsed during a winter storm. The rock gets its name from the presence of vegetation that was growing on top of it. It was similar to other sea stacks located nearby at Hopewell Rocks Provincial Park.

References 

Stacks of Canada
Rock formations of Canada
Landforms of New Brunswick
Beaches of New Brunswick
Tourist attractions in New Brunswick
Geography of New Brunswick